MV Pvt. Franklin J. Phillips (AK-3004), (former MV Evelyn Mærsk), was the fifth ship of the  built in 1980. The ship is named after Private Franklin J. Phillips, an American Marine who was awarded the Medal of Honor during the Boxer Rebellion.

Construction and commissioning 
The ship was built in 1980 at the Odense Staalskibsvaerft A/S, Lindø, Denmark. She was put into the service of Maersk Line as Evelyn Mærsk.

In 1983, she was acquired and chartered by the Navy under a long-term contract as MV Pvt. Harry Fisher (AK-3004). The ship underwent conversion at the Bethlehem Steel at Sparrows Point, Massachusetts. She was assigned to Maritime Prepositioning Ship Squadron 2 and supported the US Marine Corps Expeditionary Brigade. In 1988, the ship was renamed to MV Pvt. Franklin J. Philips (AK-3004) after it was found out that Harry Fisher was not his real name.

On 1 August 1990, she unloaded military cargos in support of Operation Desert Shield. In December 1992, the ship took part in Operation Restore Hope.

On 28 August 2003, a Visit Board Search and Seizure (VBSS) drill was held on board the ship. 

In 2008, the ship was struck from the Naval Register and later returned to Maersk Line as Mærsk Tennessee.

Awards 

 National Defense Service Medal

References

Cpl. Louis J. Hauge Jr.-class cargo ship
1979 ships
Ships built in Denmark
Gulf War ships of the United States
Merchant ships of the United States
Cargo ships of the United States Navy
Container ships of the United States Navy